Veterans Memorial Stadium is a stadium in La Crosse, Wisconsin. The original Veterans Memorial Stadium facility was built in 1948.  It was demolished in 2008 and a new structure opened in 2009. It seats 10,000, with around 6,200 seats in the main grandstand. The stadium is primarily used for football and track and field. It is the home field of the University of Wisconsin–La Crosse Eagles. The 10-lane, 400 meter track complex has hosted several NCAA championships and hosts the Wisconsin Interscholastic Athletic Association state high school track and field championships each June. The stadium complex also houses the Veterans Hall of Honor meeting room.

2009 expansion

Veterans Memorial Complex was expanded to increase stadium seating to around 10,000, improve Harring Field and the surrounding track, and provide additional athletic fields for soccer and intramural sports. Officials wanted to attract and retain large events such as the WIAA state track meet, while having the necessary fields and associated structures to support both UW–La Crosse athletic and recreational activities as well as community events and programs.  In the past, the New Orleans Saints had used La Crosse's facilities for the team's summer training camp. The university is said to be interested in attracting another NFL team to the campus.

The expansion, which had an estimated cost of about $14.5 million, began with demolition of the previous stadium in June 2008.  The field and track itself was completed in September 2008, while the entire project was finished in August 2009.

Goals of expansion

Prior to the beginning of the project, the university outlined various goals of the expansion.

Stadium
Provide seating capacity of 10,000 split between the main stadium structure and a “visitors side” seating section.
Develop facilities within the stadium for ticketing, and public restrooms.
Develop space below the stadium seating for a student fitness center.
Install new lighting in stadium.
Develop facilities within the stadium for concessions, press box, chancellor’s box, corporate viewing boxes filming platform, etc.
Develop space below stadium seating for functions such as athletic training, classrooms, locker rooms, climate controlled storage, etc.

Track
Construct a new, 9-lane (48”) lighted track with rubberized surface that meets all NCAA and WIAA guidelines for competition track facilities. Utilize a “broken-back” style track layout to achieve faster competition track and to afford ample infield space for field events.
Incorporate long jump, triple jump, and pole vault within the field on the east (“visitors”) side of the football field. In corporate high jump into the south D-zone.
Centrally locate the hammer throw, discus and javelin near the stadium complex area with permanent runways and throwing pads and cages.

Harring Field
Install new synthetic playing surface within the stadium. This will allow unlimited use of the field and it will also reduce the required number of football practice fields.
Develop one natural turf football practice field immediately adjacent to the stadium to accommodate coordinated, simultaneous practice on both the synthetic and the natural turf fields.

Soccer
Provide a minimally crowned, irrigated and lighted 225’x360’ natural turf competition field oriented north-south.
Provide an irrigated and lighted natural turf half-size practice field adjacent to the competition field.
Provide spectator seating with an approximate capacity of 300 seats.
Install permanent press facilities, scorers table, score board and public address system. Also provide team benches opposite of the spectator seating.

Student Recreation
Develop permanent, lighted student recreation fields on north end of Memorial Fields complex.

Tennis
Provide spectator seating.

Notes

External links
Official Website of Veterans Memorial Stadium Campaign
Live Webcam
Photos from UW–L

College football venues
Buildings and structures in La Crosse, Wisconsin
American football venues in Wisconsin
Wisconsin–La Crosse Eagles football
Tourist attractions in La Crosse County, Wisconsin
Monuments and memorials in Wisconsin
Sports venues completed in 2009
2009 establishments in Wisconsin
Athletics (track and field) venues in Wisconsin